The following is a list of regional Twenty20 cricket leagues in India, sorted alphabetically.

Current leagues 

† - during the most recent season

Defunct leagues

See also 
 List of cricket competitions
 Celebrity Cricket League – Non-professional T20 league played among film actors

References 

Cricket leagues in India
Twenty20 cricket leagues
Indian cricket lists
Domestic